Inal Otarovich Pukhayev (born 28 January 1992) is a Russian former football midfielder.

Club career
He made his debut in the Russian Second Division for FC FAYUR Beslan on 18 April 2011 in a game against FC Biolog-Novokubansk and was sent off on his debut.

He made his Russian Football National League debut for FC Khimki on 9 July 2012 in a game against FC Volgar Astrakhan.

References

External links
 

1992 births
People from Tskhinvali
Living people
Russian footballers
Association football midfielders
FC Khimki players
FC Torpedo Kutaisi players
FC Spartak Vladikavkaz players
FC Amkar Perm players
Russian expatriate footballers
Expatriate footballers in Georgia (country)